Jeff Essmann (born June 29, 1952) is an American politician and a Republican former member of the Montana Senate. Essmann was appointed to the Montana Senate in 2005 to represent Senate District 28. He was subsequently elected in 2006, and reelected in 2010. Essmann served as the president of the Montana Senate from 2013 to 2015.

He is most notable for proposing Senate Bill 423 to legalize use of medical marijuana in Montana.

Essmann ran for Governor of Montana in 2012 election. He withdrew after it was determined that he lacked the necessary funds and support. He also ran in the 2017 Billings mayoral election, but was defeated by Bill Cole in the second round by a 28% margin.

Essmann served as the chairman of the Montana Republican Party from 2015 to 2017.

References

1952 births
Living people
Republican Party Montana state senators
Presidents of the Montana Senate
State political party chairs of Montana
Politicians from Billings, Montana
University of Montana alumni
Illinois Institute of Technology alumni